The 2003 Hong Kong Sevens was an international rugby sevens tournament that took place at the Hong Kong Stadium between 28 and 30 March 2003. It was the 28th edition of the Hong Kong Sevens and was the fifth tournament of the 2002–03 IRB Sevens World Series. Twenty-four teams competed in the tournament and were separated into six groups of four with the top eight teams qualifying through to the cup tournament.

Due to the SARS outbreak that was occurring in Hong Kong, some teams delayed their arrival to the country with three teams (Argentina, France and Italy withdrawing from the competition.

England defended their Hong Kong title that they won the previous year defeating New Zealand in the final by a score of 22–17. The plate-final saw Canada defeat Scotland while the United States took home the bowl defeating Japan.

Teams
Compared to other tournament of the series, the Hong Kong Sevens had 24 teams compete for the title instead of the regular sixteen teams that usually competed in a World Series event. The tournament saw three teams withdraw after the official draw was revealed on February 27 due to the SARS outbreak that was occurring in South-East Asia. On March 21, France and Italy withdrew from the competition with Argentina withdrawing two days later. They were replaced by Namibia, Tonga and the Netherlands respectively. Other teams delayed their arrivals to Hong Kong with Fiji and New Zealand only arriving three days before the tournament started.

Format
The teams were drawn into six pools of four teams each. Each team played the other teams in their pool once, with three points awarded for a win, two points for a draw, and one point for a loss (no points awarded for a forfeit). The pool stage was played over the first two days of the tournament. The top team from each pool along with the two best runners-up advanced to the Cup quarter finals. The remaining four runners-up along with the four best third-placed teams advanced to the Plate quarter finals. The remaining eight teams went on to the Bowl quarter finals.

Pool stage
The draw for the 2003 Hong Kong Sevens was held on 27 February 2003 with the revised draw occurring on the 25 March.

Pool A

Source: HK Sevens

Source: HK Sevens

Pool B

Source: HK Sevens

Source: HK Sevens

Pool C

Source: HK Sevens

Source: HK Sevens

Pool D

Source: HK Sevens

Source: HK Sevens

Pool E

Source: HK Sevens

Source: HK Sevens

Pool F

Source: HK Sevens

Source: HK Sevens

Knockout stage

Bowl

Source: HK Sevens

Plate

Source: HK Sevens

Cup

Source: HK Sevens

Tournament placings

Source: Rugby7.com

References

Hong Kong Sevens
Hong Kong Sevens
Hong Kong Sevens
Hong Kong Sevens